The Delta State Peoples Democratic Party (also known as Delta PDP) is the state level chapter of the Peoples Democratic Party in Delta State, Nigeria. It is the current ruling political party in the southern oil-rich state and has produced governors since the advent of the fourth republic in 1999.

The party's executive is led by Chairman Kingsley Esiso and Deputy Chair Val Arenyinka.

Current elected officials

Statewide offices
Governor: Arthur Okowa Ifeanyi
Deputy Governor: Kingsley Otuaro

Members of the Senate

House of Representatives

List of state party chairmen

See also
Enugu State Peoples Democratic Party

References

Politics of Delta State
Delta State